The Thompson–Fasbender House, located at 649 West 4th Street in Hastings, Minnesota is listed on the National Register of Historic Places.  It was built in 1880 by William Thompson who came to Minnesota in 1857 from Maine.  He was a banker, wheat-buyer, and land-owner who also was part-owner of a saw mill and door and sash factory.  His access to woodworkers is reflected in the home's finishing. Its Second Empire architecture is reflected in its mansard roof featuring scalloped wooden shingles and bracketed cornices.

In 1929, Dr. Herman Fasbender, Sr. purchased the home and transformed it into Saint Raphael Hospital, which had been housed in the VanDyke-Libby House. When the Regina Memorial Hospital opened in 1953, Saint Raphael closed and the house was converted into a tenement building; Fasbender then moved his practice to the Fasbender Clinic building. Today the home is a bed and breakfast inn.

References

1880 establishments in Minnesota
Bed and breakfasts in Minnesota
Buildings and structures in Hastings, Minnesota
Defunct hospitals in Minnesota
Houses completed in 1880
Houses in Dakota County, Minnesota
Houses on the National Register of Historic Places in Minnesota
National Register of Historic Places in Dakota County, Minnesota
Second Empire architecture in Minnesota